Monergism is the view within Christian theology which holds that God works through the Holy Spirit to bring about the salvation of an individual through spiritual regeneration, regardless of the individual's cooperation. It is most often associated with Lutheranism, as well as with the Reformed tradition (such as Presbyterianism, low church Anglicanism, Puritans, Dutch Reformed Church, Reformed Baptist etc.) and its doctrine of irresistible grace, and particularly with historical doctrinal differences between Calvinism and Arminianism. This position supposedly contrasts with what is pejoratively called Arminian synergism, the belief that God and individuals cooperate to bring individuals salvation.

Statement of the doctrine

Monergism states that the regeneration of an individual is the work of God through the Holy Spirit alone, as opposed to Synergism, which, in its simplest form, argues that the human will cooperates with God's grace in order to be regenerated. To most synergists, regeneration is a process that begins when a man responds to God's initiative, repents, and begins the labor of loving God and his neighbor. Monergists believe that regeneration takes place as a single act in which God regenerates a man from his fleshly state and, thus now enabled, a man can believe, and that he inevitably and invariably will do so.

While most synergists hold that God initiates all the work but that the work of salvation requires man's "free will," monergists maintain that God alone initiates and completes all the work of salvation. To a monergist, a person does possess human freedom before regeneration (if by freedom, is meant the ability to choose what one wants). Yet, a man; because of his unregenerate and fallen nature is in slavery to sin (i.e. man chooses sin; because that is what he wants); because he is dead in his sin before God's regeneration and in this state he is unable to choose God (because he does not want God; he may want the gifts from God, but not God). Synergists, on the other hand, have varying beliefs regarding man's freedom to respond to God. According to monergism, faith in Christ only springs from a heart first renewed by God. Among various arguments, proponents believe  to mean that no one can possibly confess Jesus as Lord apart from the Holy Spirit's prompting and being a true conviction of his heart.

According to monergists, all men are conceived and born with an unregenerated human nature, and faith to believe is beyond the power of this unregenerated human nature. God circumcises the heart. The apostle John is understood by some monergists as having recorded Jesus saying that we love darkness, hate the light and will not come into the light (monergists assume that "doing the truth" and "loving the light" in consequence are the results of God's irresistible grace which brings a love and faith enabled by grace. The natural man, apart from the quickening work of the Holy Spirit, will not come to Christ on his own; since he is at enmity with God; and so, will not understand spiritual things (meaning the experience of loving God; i.e. seeing God's loveliness). Reading or hearing the word of God alone cannot elicit saving faith in the reader(). The monergist believes in heralding the gospel indiscriminately, and the Holy Spirit regenerates whom He will, according to His sovereign grace.

Monergists believe that once the "eyes have been made healthy" a person will inevitably follow God; because the Infinite is effective to what the Infinite wills to effect. "Therefore, my dear friends, as you have always obeyed—not only in my presence, but now much more in my absence—continue to work out your salvation with fear and trembling, 13 for it is God who works in you to will and to act in order to fulfill his good purpose." Philippians 2:12-13. God always does according to His good pleasure; and no thing can stop an infinite Being's good pleasure.

Monergistic salvation, synergistic damnation
Lutheranism and Reformed Protestantism, including those who ascribe to Covenant Theology, hold to the soteriological position of monergistic salvation and synergistic damnation, rejecting Calvin's monergistic damnation and Arminius's synergistic salvation.

Lutheranism teaches that God predestines some to salvation via His foreknowledge but does not predestine others to damnation, as God wills that all might be saved (1 Tim 2:3-6, Rom. 11:32, etc.).  The Scriptural basis for man's justification by faith alone is summarized in the Epitome of the Formula of Concord under Free Will and The Righteousness of Faith Before God. The Righteousness of Faith, and fully discussed in the Solid Declaration of the Formula of Concord under Free Will and The Righteousness of Faith.  Likewise the Defense of the Augsburg Confession discusses the Scriptural basis of man's Justification. Lutherans thus confess that salvation is monergistic, saving faith being the work of the Holy Spirit alone while man is still the uncooperative enemy of God (Rom. 5:8,10), but man's damnation is synergistic: Scripture states repeatedly that man participates in and bears the responsibility for resisting God's grace of the free—not enforced—gift of salvation (ex: Matt. 23:37, Heb. 12:25, Acts 7:51, John 16:9, Heb. 12:15, etc.).  Thus, you will see Calvinists incorrectly accuse Lutherans of Arminianism and Arminians incorrectly accuse Lutherans of Calvinism.  Lutherans view their stance not as having one foot in Calvinism and one foot in Arminianism, but having both feet firmly planted in scripture. This view is also shared by some Augustinian denominations such as the Church of the Redeemer.

Reformed Baptists confess The London Baptist Confession of Faith of 1689.

Opposition to monergism

Synergists have a variety of beliefs. Many would hold the same views listed above in describing how God opens the eyes and ears to a person to both see and hear the Salvation of God before he has faith. They would make the distinction, however, that a person can reject this revelation and maintain their desire to remain as they are. They would maintain that God, in his grace, calls all human beings to follow him, but he allows the "free will" of the individual to not respond to him. Most synergists believe man is unable to do good but God has extended grace to all people which gives them the ability to have faith in Christ (see prevenient grace). Synergists believe salvation is a matter of human and divine synergy, not divine choice alone without human cooperation.

Some synergists believe that monergism is fatalistic; because they interpret it to believe that a man is not free to resist God's (outward) call. Many monergists, however, would counter that when the heart has been regenerated, man accepts God's (inward) call freely and so would defend that their Christianity, while not predicated on "free will," does, in fact, involve their freedom. Opponents of monergism would argue that this type of freedom is akin to being free to take the one-and-only choice available.

These arguments are both aspects of the general argument that monergism means that God chooses individuals without any condition provided by the individual (See unconditional election). Therefore, according to monergism, the only reason that one person is saved and another is not is because God sovereignly decided, without any conditions provided by the two individuals, to save one  of them. It follows that the only reason people are not saved is because God sovereignly chooses not to save some individuals. Therefore, monergism is said to lead to the conclusion that God does not in fact love every human being nor want to save every person. By contrast, synergists maintain that God does not save certain individuals because they do not desire to be saved. According to both monergism and synergism, God will not force His will or His forgiveness on those who do not desire it.

Robin Phillips has argued that monergism and monoenergism, the latter of which was condemned as heretical during the patristic era, are closely related.

References

Sources
 "Regeneration" by J. I. Packer

External links
Monergism.com - Contains articles explaining and defending Calvinistic monergism.
A Divine and Supernatural Light, Immediately Imparted to the Soul by the Spirit of God by Jonathan Edwards
Two Views of Regeneration (chart) by John Hendryx
The Work of the Trinity in Monergism by John Hendryx
Jesus Teaches Monergistic Regeneration by John Hendryx
The New Genesis by R.C. Sproul
A Defense of Monergistic Regeneration by Gannon Murphy
Monergistic Regeneration 2-Part MP3 Lecture by Art Azurdia

Calvinist theology
Pneumatology
Salvation in Protestantism
Christian terminology